KEQP-LP (106.9 FM) was a radio station broadcasting a religious radio format. Formerly licensed to Modesto, California, United States, the station was owned by Calvary Chapel of Modesto, Inc.

On September 24, 2012, the Calvary Chapel of Modesto surrendered the license for KEQP-LP to the Federal Communications Commission (FCC). The FCC cancelled the station's license on October 5, 2012, and deleted its call sign from their database.

References

External links
 

EQP-LP
EQP-LP
Radio stations disestablished in 2012
Defunct radio stations in the United States
Defunct religious radio stations in the United States
2012 disestablishments in California
EQP-LP